Gerres erythrourus the deep-bodied mojarra, also known as the short silverbiddy or short silverbelly, is a species of ray-finned fish from the family Gerreidae, a mojarra. It is native to marine and brackish waters of coastal waters of the Indian Ocean and the western Pacific Ocean, far towards Vanuatu. It inhabits estuaries, coastal waters and lagoons. This species is important to local commercial fisheries in many tropical countries.

References 

 Itis.org
 Animaldiversity Web
 WoRMS

erythrourus
Fish described in 1791